7 Car Pileup was a groove-based rock band from Tempe, Arizona. It has heavy roots in old-school funk and a small hint of jazz. The band consists of Mark Mason (vocals/guitar), Jess Pruitt (bass), and Mike Vigil (drums). Their name is taken from the TV show Scrubs.

History
7 Car Pileup self-produced their debut album in a home studio in a house they all lived in. The self-titled album was released in late 2008.

The band recorded an EP with Music Producer Bob Hoag at Flying Blanket studios in Mesa Arizona in March 2009. The song Drive-In from their EP was the FM102x song of the day on June 23, 2009.

7 Car Pileup opened for Authority Zero at the 2009 ASU Polytechnic Home Coming, Cage the Elephant at the Marquee Theatre, and The Crash Kings.

Discography

EPs
Zombies With Dino (2009)

Albums
7 Car Pileup (2008)

References

External links
 Official website
 MySpace
 Facebook
 Last.fm

Musical groups from Tempe, Arizona
Rock music groups from Arizona